Eugène Fredrik Jansson (18 March 1862, Stockholm – 15 June 1915, Skara) was a Swedish painter known for his night-time land- and cityscapes dominated by shades of blue. Towards the end of his life, from about 1904, he mainly painted male nudes. The earlier of these phases has caused him to sometimes be referred to as blåmålaren, "the blue-painter".

Life

Jansson's parents belonged to a social stratum straddling the working and the lower middle class, but they were interested in art and music and ambitious for their two sons, Eugène and his younger brother Adrian. Eugène went to the German School in Stockholm and took piano lessons. An attack of scarlet fever at the age of fourteen caused him health issues from which he suffered for the rest of his life, including bad eyesight and hearing and chronic kidney problems.

Jansson enrolled in the Tekniska skolan (now Konstfack) and studied with Edvard Perséus, a painter who ran a private art school in Stockholm. He was accepted into the Antique school of the Royal Swedish Academy of Arts in 1881, but did not have the means to follow most of his contemporaries to Paris for further studies. Remaining in Stockholm, which supplied him most of his motifs, his first trip outside the Nordic countries would come in 1900, when he had already become well-established as a painter and his economic situation had started to improve. In his youth, he assisted Perséus in his portrait production and painted some still lifes, but he eventually found his favourite motifs in the city surrounding him.

He lived his whole life together with his mother and brother at Södermalm, the southern part of Stockholm. They eventually settled in a flat at No. 40 Bastugatan, on a height with a view over most of central Stockholm including the Riddarfjärden bay and the Old town. Most of his paintings from the 1890s up to 1904 are night views over Riddarfjärden, as he would have seen it from his home, or street views from various parts of Södermalm. They are dominated by shades of blue and very visible brush strokes, often crossing one another. Over the years his paintings moved towards increasing simplification and abstraction, and at the end of his "blue" period, little more than the street lights and their reflections in the waters can be discerned from the mass of blue of the canvas.

After 1904, when he had already achieved success with his Stockholm views, Jansson confessed to a friend that he felt absolutely exhausted and had no more wish to continue with what he had done until then. He stopped participating in exhibitions for several years and went over to figure painting. To combat the health issues he had suffered from since childhood, he became a diligent swimmer and winter bather, often visiting the navy bathhouse, where he found the new subjects for his paintings. He painted groups of sunbathing sailors, and young muscular nude men lifting weights or doing other physical exercises.

Art historians and critics have long avoided the issue of any possible homoerotic tendencies in this later phase of his art, but later studies (see Brummer 1999) have established that Jansson was in all probability homosexual and appears to have had a relationship with at least one of his models. His brother, Adrian Jansson, who was himself homosexual and survived Eugène by many years, burnt all his letters and many other papers, possibly to avoid scandal (homosexuality was illegal in Sweden until 1944).

Notes

References
Brummer, Hans Henrik: "Blå skymning och atleter. Kring Eugène Janssons måleri", Konsthistorisk tidskrift, 68 (1999), pp. 65–79.
Zachau, Inga, Eugène Jansson: den blå stadens målare, Lund: Signum, 1997.

External links

19th-century Swedish painters
Swedish male painters
20th-century Swedish painters
1862 births
1915 deaths
Artists from Stockholm
Gay painters
Swedish gay artists
Swedish LGBT painters
19th-century Swedish male artists
20th-century Swedish male artists